The 2019 Go Bowling at The Glen was a Monster Energy NASCAR Cup Series race held on August 4, 2019 at Watkins Glen International in Watkins Glen, New York. Contested over 90 laps on the  road course, it was the 22nd race of the 2019 Monster Energy NASCAR Cup Series season.

Report

Background

Watkins Glen International (nicknamed "The Glen") is an automobile race track located in Watkins Glen, New York at the southern tip of Seneca Lake. It was long known around the world as the home of the Formula One United States Grand Prix, which it hosted for twenty consecutive years (1961–1980), but the site has been home to road racing of nearly every class, including the World Sportscar Championship, Trans-Am, Can-Am, NASCAR Sprint Cup Series, the International Motor Sports Association and the IndyCar Series.

Initially, public roads in the village were used for the race course. In 1956 a permanent circuit for the race was built. In 1968 the race was extended to six hours, becoming the 6 Hours of Watkins Glen. The circuit's current layout has more or less been the same since 1971, although a chicane was installed at the uphill Esses in 1975 to slow cars through these corners, where there was a fatality during practice at the 1973 United States Grand Prix. The chicane was removed in 1985, but another chicane called the "Inner Loop" was installed in 1992 after J.D. McDuffie's fatal accident during the previous year's NASCAR Winston Cup event.

The circuit is known as the Mecca of North American road racing and is a very popular venue among fans and drivers. The facility is currently owned by International Speedway Corporation.

Entry list
 (i) denotes driver who are ineligible for series driver points.
 (R) denotes rookie driver.

Practice

First practice

Final practice

Qualifying

Qualifying results

Race

Stage results

Stage One
Laps: 20

Stage Two
Laps: 20

Final stage results

Stage Three
Laps: 50

Race statistics
 Lead changes: 5 among 4 different drivers
 Cautions/Laps: 4 for 13
 Red flags: 0
 Time of race: 2 hours, 14 minutes and 17 seconds
 Average speed:

Media

Television
NBC Sports covered the race on the television side. Rick Allen and Steve Letarte called from the regular booth for the race; Motor Racing Network broadcaster Mike Bagley called the race from the Esses, Dale Earnhardt Jr. had the call from Turn 5, and Jeff Burton called from Turns 6 & 7. Dave Burns, Marty Snider and Kelli Stavast covered from pit lane during the race.

Radio
Motor Racing Network had the radio call for the race, which was simulcast on Sirius XM NASCAR Radio. Alex Hayden, Jeff Striegle & 2 time Watkins Glen winner Rusty Wallace covered the action when the field raced down the front straightaway. Dave Moody called the race when the field raced thru the esses. Kurt Becker covered the action when the field raced thru the inner loop and turn 5 and Kyle Rickey covered the action in turn 10 & 11. Winston Kelley, Steve Post & Kim Coon called the action from the pits for MRN.

Standings after the race

Drivers' Championship standings

Manufacturers' Championship standings

Note: Only the first 16 positions are included for the driver standings.
. – Driver has clinched a position in the Monster Energy NASCAR Cup Series playoffs.

References

Go Bowling at The Glen
Go Bowling at The Glen
Go Bowling at The Glen
NASCAR races at Watkins Glen International